The INTEROP V-Lab (International Virtual Laboratory for Enterprise Interoperability) is a network of organizations, which links scientists, research centers, representatives of industry, and small and medium-sized enterprises. The members come from several European countries as well as China and represent 250 scientists and 70 organizations.

INTEROP-VLab was founded in 2007 and is the continuation of the INTEROP Network of Excellence (Interoperability research for networked enterprise applications and software), a research initiative of the European Union founded early 2000s, which developed the Model Driven Interoperability (MDI) Framework.

In 2012 Guy Doumeingts was appointed general manager of INTEROP-VLab.

Overview 
INTEROP-VLab is an initiative that is working within the context of interoperability, in particular the so-called Enterprise Interoperability (EI). It aims to link together in a network researchers and research institutions and industry representatives, engaged in developing approaches and integrative solutions to connect heterogeneous industrial systems, public administrations or organizations.

The basic objective of INTEROP-VLab is the defragmentation of the European research and scientific landscape and support the cooperation of other regions of the world:
 through support of research, teaching and innovation in the field of Enterprise Interoperability
 through the work of a center of excellence in the field of Enterprise Interoperability world

Activities 
The activities of INTEROP-VLab consist of research, teaching and training services and standardization consultancy.

The independent research within INTEROP-VLabs is based on the following three key components:
 Information and communication technology as a technological foundation of interoperable systems
 Modeling of processes, organizations and organizational units to develop and implement appropriate structures for interoperable companies and public organizations
 The development and specification of ontologies to ensure semantic consistency within organizations affiliated with the following priorities:
 Theoretical groundwork
 Investigation and development of key technologies
 Development of exemplary applications

Within INTEROP-VLab developed solutions include:
 IV kmap (INTEROP-VLab Knowledge Map ), a competence management system within the EI range that is based on an ontology-based search engine and allows to find relevant documents and content relating to a particular knowledge domain.
 The IV e-learning platform, with 50 web-courses and seminars in the field of EI, modeling, ontologies offers and Architecture & Platforms

Members 
The members of the INTEROP-VLab are organize in poles of geographic regions within a State or group of States. Activities of each organization are coordinated at European level. The members of the INTEROP-VLab are:
 INTEROP-VLab poles France Grand Sud-Ouest (PGSO)
 DFI (German Forum for interoperability eV)
 INTEROP-VLab UK Pole
 INTEROP-VLab China Pole
 INTEROP-VLab INTERVAL Pole
 INTEROP-VLab Portuguese poles (INTEROP-ptrp)
 INTEROP-VLab.IT
 INTEROP North Pole

References

External links 
 INTEROP-VLab Website

Enterprise modelling
International scientific organizations
Organizations established in 2007
International organisations based in Belgium